Madertala, Bangladesh is a village in Khulna District in the Khulna Division of southwestern Bangladesh.

References

Populated places in Khulna Division